Juan Holgado (born 16 April 1968) is a Spanish archer and Olympic champion. He competed at the 1992 Summer Olympics in Barcelona, where he won a gold medal with the Spanish archery team, together with team mates Antonio Vázquez and Alfonso Menéndez.

References

1968 births
Living people
Spanish male archers
Olympic archers of Spain
Archers at the 1988 Summer Olympics
Archers at the 1992 Summer Olympics
Olympic gold medalists for Spain
Olympic medalists in archery
Medalists at the 1992 Summer Olympics
20th-century Spanish people